La Gloria is a painting by Titian, commissioned by Charles V in 1550 or 1551 and completed in 1554. It was first given this title by José Sigüenza in 1601 — it is also known as The Trinity, The Final Judgement , Paradise, and Adoration of the Trinity.

It shows an image from Augustine of Hippo's The City of God describing the glory gained by the blessed and on the right includes Charles himself, with his wife Isabella of Portugal, his son Philip II of Spain, his daughter Joanna of Austria, his sisters: Mary of Hungary and Eleanor of Austria, all wearing their shrouds. Titian's signature is shown on a scroll held by John the Evangelist. ″On a lower level [at the right] are two elderly bearded men identified as Pietro Aretino and Titian himself in profile.″

At the top is an image of the Holy Trinity next to the Virgin Mary and Saint John the Baptist. The painting also features King David, Moses and Noah, along with a figure in green identified as Mary Magdalene, the Erythraean Sibyl, Judith, Rachel or the Catholic Church.

Charles took it to the Monastery of Yuste on his retirement there. It was then moved to the Escorial Monastery until 1837, when it was mentioned as among the works in the Prado Museum, where it is today.

References

1554 paintings
Paintings by Titian in the Museo del Prado
Angels in art
Birds in art
Books in art
Paintings of the Virgin Mary
Paintings depicting the Holy Trinity